Alexandra is the feminine form of the given name Alexander. It is often shortened to Alex, Ali, Sandra or Sandy in English.

Alexandra may also refer to:

Places 
 Alexandra, New Zealand, town in the South Island of New Zealand
 Alexandra, Waikato, town in the North Island of New Zealand, now called Pirongia
 Alexandra, Gauteng, township near Johannesburg, South Africa
 Alexandra, Victoria, rural town in Australia
 Alexandra (Penarth electoral ward), a former electoral ward in the Vale of Glamorgan, Wales
 Alexandra (provincial electoral district), a former electoral district in Alberta, Canada
 Alexandra Ward, Ipswich, Suffolk, England
 Alexandra, an electoral ward to Oldham Council, Greater Manchester, England
 Alexandra, an electoral ward for Haringey London Borough Council elections, UK
 Alexandra Hospital, hospital in Singapore
 Alexandra Bridge (disambiguation), multiple bridges and other locations
 Alexandra School (disambiguation), multiple schools
 Alexandria Township (disambiguation), in the United States

Royalty and nobility
 Alexandra Feodorovna (Charlotte of Prussia) (1798–1860), Empress consort of Russia
 Alexandra Feodorovna (Alix of Hesse) (1872–1918), last Tsarina of Russia
 Alexandra of Denmark (1844–1925), Queen consort of the United Kingdom of Great Britain and Ireland and Empress consort of India as the wife of King-Emperor Edward VII
 Aleksandra von Engelhardt (1754–1838), Russian lady-in-waiting

Transportation
 3061 Alexandra, GWR 3031 Class locomotive built in 1897
 HMY Alexandra, British royal yacht built in 1908
 HMS Alexandra (1875), British ironclad battleship
 , a Panamanian and Italian cruise ship in service 1988-92

Football clubs
 Crewe Alexandra F.C., English football club
 Mold Alexandra F.C., Welsh football club
 Alexandra Athletic F.C., 19th-century Scottish football club

Other 
 Alexandra's Project, 2003 Australian film
 "Alexandra" (poem), poem by Mongane Wally Serote
 Alexandra, or Cassandra, a poem attributed to the Hellenistic Greek poet Lycophron
 Alexandra, the title of a 1934 film adaptation of the operetta Princess Charming
 Alexandra (film), 2007 Russian film
 54 Alexandra, asteroid discovered in 1858
 Alexandra (1905 automobile), early British automobile
 Alexandra (Nikita character)
 Alexandra (singer), German singer
 Alexandra (wet fly), an old English trout fly

See also
 Alexandria (disambiguation)